The 2018–19 Edmonton Oilers season was the 40th season for the National Hockey League (NHL) franchise that was established on June 22, 1979, and 47th season including their play in the World Hockey Association (WHA). The Oilers were eliminated from playoff contention on April 1, 2019, after the St. Louis Blues' shootout win against the Colorado Avalanche, missing the playoffs for the second consecutive season and for the twelfth time in the past thirteen seasons.

Standings

Schedule and results

Pre-season
The pre-season schedule was published on June 13, 2018.

Regular season
The regular season schedule was released on June 21, 2018.

Player statistics
As of April 6, 2019

Skaters

Goaltenders

†Denotes player spent time with another team before joining the Oilers. Stats reflect time with the Oilers only.
‡Denotes player was traded mid-season. Stats reflect time with the Oilers only.
Bold/italics denotes franchise record.

Awards and honours

Awards

Milestones

Records
 9: An NHL record for most consecutive team goals a player has factored on to begin a season by Connor McDavid (4 goals, 5 assists) on October 16, 2018.

Transactions
The Oilers have been involved in the following transactions during the 2018–19 season.

Trades

Free agents

Waivers

Contract terminations

Retirement

Signings

Draft picks

Below are the Edmonton Oilers' selections at the 2018 NHL Entry Draft, which was held on June 22 and 23, 2018, at the American Airlines Center in Dallas, Texas.

Notes:
 The Washington Capitals' second-round pick went to the Edmonton Oilers as the result of a trade on June 23, 2018, that sent a third and fifth-round pick both in 2018 (71st and 133rd overall) to Montreal in exchange for this pick.

References

Edmonton Oilers seasons
Edmonton Oilers
Oilers
Oilers
Oilers